Heleomyzinae is a subfamily of flies in the family Heleomyzidae. There are about 17 genera and more than 400 described species in Heleomyzinae.

Genera
These 17 genera belong to the subfamily Heleomyzinae:

 Acantholeria Garrett, 1921
 Amoebaleria Garrett, 1921
 Anorostoma Loew, 1862
 Cinderella Steyskal, 1949
 Eccoptomera Loew, 1862
 Heleomyza Fallén, 1810
 Lutomyia Aldrich, 1922
 Morpholeria C.B.Garrett, 1921
 Neoleria Malloch, 1919
 Neossos Malloch, 1927
 Oecothea Haliday, 1837
 Oldenbergiella Czerny, 1924
 Orbellia Robineau-Desvoidy, 1830
 Paraneossos Wheeler, 1955
 Pseudoleria Garrett, 1921
 Schroederella Enderlein, 1920
 Scoliocentra Loew, 1862

References

Further reading

External links

 

Heleomyzidae
Articles created by Qbugbot